Synaptus filiformis (colloquially hairy click beetle) is a species of beetle belonging to the family Elateridae.

It is native to Europe and Western Asia.

References

Elateridae